Francisco Jorge Tavares Oliveira (born 5 February 2000), known as Chiquinho, is a Portuguese professional footballer who plays as a winger for Premier League club Wolverhampton Wanderers.

Club career

Estoril
Born in Cascais, Lisbon District, Chiquinho spent nearly one decade at the youth system of local Sporting CP. In 2019 he signed with neighbouring G.D. Estoril Praia, making his Liga Portugal 2 debut on 18 January 2020 in a 1–0 home win against Académica de Coimbra where he came on as a 60th-minute substitute. He scored his first goal as a professional the following month, in the 4–1 victory over Casa Pia A.C. also at the Estádio António Coimbra da Mota.

In the 2020–21 season, Chiquinho played 13 games to help the club return to the Primeira Liga as champions. He made his first appearance in the competition on 7 August 2021, starting a 2–0 away defeat of F.C. Arouca. His first goal came later that month, when he closed the 2–1 home win over C.S. Marítimo.

Wolverhampton Wanderers
On 17 January 2022, Chiquinho joined Wolverhampton Wanderers on a three-and-a-half year contract, for a reported fee of £2.9 million that could potentially rise to £4.2 million with add-ons. He made his debut on 5 February, which coincidentally was his 22nd birthday, replacing Leander Dendoncker late into a 1–0 home loss against Norwich City in the round of 32 of the FA Cup. His Premier League bow took place five days later, against Arsenal and again off the bench, in another defeat at Molineux Stadium by that scoreline. He claimed his first assist on 10 March, setting up Rúben Neves for the fourth goal in the 4–0 home rout of Watford.

Chiquinho suffered a serious knee injury in a pre-season friendly with Burnley in July 2022.

International career
Chiquinho made his Portugal under-21 debut on 12 November 2021, replacing Fábio Silva in the second half of the 1–0 win in Cyprus in the 2023 UEFA European Championship qualifiers.

Career statistics

Honours
Estoril
Liga Portugal 2: 2020–21

References

External links

2000 births
Living people
Portuguese sportspeople of Cape Verdean descent
Sportspeople from Cascais
Black Portuguese sportspeople
Portuguese footballers
Association football wingers
Primeira Liga players
Liga Portugal 2 players
Sporting CP footballers
C.D. Tondela players
G.D. Estoril Praia players
Premier League players
Wolverhampton Wanderers F.C. players
Portugal youth international footballers
Portugal under-21 international footballers
Portuguese expatriate footballers
Expatriate footballers in England
Portuguese expatriate sportspeople in England